Ilaisa Droasese (born 13 September 1999) is a Fijian rugby union player who plays for the Fijian Drua, having previously played for  in Super Rugby. His playing position is centre or wing. He was named in the Reds squad for the 2021 Super Rugby AU season. He also plays for Wests in the Queensland Premier Rugby competition.

Reference list

External links
Rugby.com.au profile
itsrugby.co.uk profile

1999 births
Fijian rugby union players
Living people
Rugby union centres
Rugby union wings
Brisbane City (rugby union) players
Queensland Reds players
Fijian Drua players